Bruno Lima Basolu (born 4 February 1996) is an Argentine professional volleyball player. He is part of the Argentine national team. A bronze medallist at the Olympic Games Tokyo 2020.

Honours

Clubs
 National championships
 2014/2015  Argentine Cup, with Bolívar Vóley
 2017/2018  French SuperCup, with Chaumont VB 52

Youth national team
 2012  CSV U19 South American Championship
 2015  FIVB U21 World Championship
 2016  U23 Pan American Cup

Individual awards
 2019: CSV South American Championship – Best Opposite

References

External links
 
 
 
 Player profile at Volleybox.net

1996 births
Living people
People from San Juan, Argentina
Sportspeople from San Juan Province, Argentina
Argentine men's volleyball players
Olympic volleyball players of Argentina
Olympic medalists in volleyball
Olympic bronze medalists for Argentina
Medalists at the 2020 Summer Olympics
Volleyball players at the 2016 Summer Olympics
Volleyball players at the 2020 Summer Olympics
Argentine expatriate sportspeople in France
Expatriate volleyball players in France
Argentine expatriate sportspeople in Germany
Expatriate volleyball players in Germany
Argentine expatriate sportspeople in Turkey
Expatriate volleyball players in Turkey
Opposite hitters